Edward Sacheverell Chandos-Pole (1 March 1792 – 19 January 1863) was a Guards officer and High Sheriff of Derbyshire in 1827.

Biography

Edward was the son of Sacheverell Pole, who adopted the additional surname of Chandos in 1807. He was educated at Harrow from 1813 to 1817, and matriculated at St Mary Hall, Oxford on 14 February 1817, though is not recorded as taking a degree.

Chandos-Pole purchased a commission in the 1st Foot Guards as an ensign on 1 May 1808, and fought in the Walcheren Campaign in 1809, and in the Peninsular War until 1813. He inherited the family property of Radbourne Hall from his father on 14 April 1813 and retired from the Army, although he did command a troop of Yeomanry Cavalry for Derbyshire. He was known in that county simply as "The Squire".

He was High Sheriff of Derbyshire in 1827, and was made a deputy lieutenant of the county in 1855. Amongst his children were Edward Sacheverell Chandos Pole who was born in 1826, Henry Chandos Pole Gell born in 1829, and daughters, Eleanor born in 1824 and Charlotte born in 1830.

References

1863 deaths
1792 births
People educated at Harrow School
Alumni of St Mary Hall, Oxford
People from South Derbyshire District
Deputy Lieutenants of Derbyshire
Grenadier Guards officers
High Sheriffs of Derbyshire